Fanny Rush is a London-based portrait painter, best known for her portrait of US Ambassador Robert Tuttle for the American Embassy, London 2015.

Biography
Based in Chelsea, London, Fanny Rush is a portrait painter, the daughter of two artists, Peter Rush and Caroline Lucas and sister of the sculptor Joe Rush. She is also the granddaughter of the author Mary Norton best known for the Children's classics Bedknobs and Broomsticks and The Borrowers. Norton won the 1952 Carnegie Medal and for the 70th anniversary of the medal in 2007 it was named one of the top ten winning works. She was also the winner of The Lewis Caroll Award (1960).

Portraits
Rush has painted portraits of:
 Ambassador Robert Holmes Tuttle, US Ambassador to the UK. This portrait hangs at The American Embassy, London.
 Sir William Castell, Chairman of The Wellcome Trust, Executive Director of B.P. and of General Electric, USA. This portrait hangs at The Wellcome Trust, London.
 Sir Paul Nurse, Nobel Laureate former President of Rockefeller University New York, former President of the Royal Society London and Chief Executive and Director of the Francis Crick Institute London.
 Sir Michael Dixon, Chairman of the Natural History Museum, London.
 John Studzinski CBE, Senior Managing Director and Global Head of Blackstone Group, New York.
 Sunil Mittal, founder Chairman and Managing Director of Bharti Airtel Group, India.
 Mervyn Davies, Baron Davies of Abersoch CBE, formerly UK Trade Minister and Chairman of Standard Chartered Bank.
 Sharad Pawar, Minister for Agriculture, India, and President of the International Cricket Council.
 Oliver Stocken CBE, Chairman of Marylebone Cricket Club and of the Natural History Museum, London.
 Kevin Ching C.E.O. of Sotheby's Asia, Hong Kong.
 Shane Warne (2005), commissioned by Marylebone Cricket Club for the Long Room at Lord's Cricket Ground, London
 Charles Dance, Actor.

Publications
Published works include Painting the light by Fanny Rush, The Artist Magazine February 2015 and The Patience of Ordinary Things, published by Phaidon Press.

References

Sources
 Shane Warne: The UK based artists chose Warne fo. Ww.itimes.com (2010-04-01). Retrieved on 2014-01-22.
 Photographer's Eye: Frank Herholdt. Imagesource.com. Retrieved on 2014-01-22.
 http://fannyrush.com/webcms/wp-content/uploads/2013/11/fanny_rush_catalogue_2013.pdf

External links
 Fanny Rush. Fanny Rush.

Living people
Year of birth missing (living people)
21st-century British painters
21st-century British women artists
English portrait painters
English women painters
Painters from London
20th-century English women
20th-century English people
21st-century English women
21st-century English people